Jalapão is a semi-arid microregion in the state of Tocantins, Brazil.
Parts of the microregion have dramatic landscapes with large orange sand dunes, towering rock formations and fast-flowing clear rivers and streams.
This is attractive to tourists, and led to Jalapão being chosen for a season of the US version of the Survivor TV series.

Environment
It has an arid savanna climate with orange sand dunes and rock formations, but is crossed by many fast-flowing rivers and streams.
Conservation units include the Jalapão State Park, the Nascentes do Rio Parnaíba National Park, the Serra Geral do Tocantins Ecological Station, the Serra da Tabatinga Environmental Protection Area and the Jalapão Environmental Protection Area.

Tourism

The region is a destination for adventure tourism and ecotourism, with the main attractions in Mateiros, Novo Acordo, Ponte Alta and São Félix.
The dunes of fine orange sand reach  in height.
The Mumbuca and Prata villages, formerly quilombo, let tourists experience the local culture.
The Serra do Espirito Santo is an interesting rock formation.

The 18th season of Survivor TV series, Survivor: Tocantins, was shot in the Jalapão region.
Residents and local media complained about areas being closed and environmental damage. 
The producers said the closures were temporary in the areas where filming was being done, and they were committed to restore any damage.

References

Sources

 

Populated places in Tocantins
Microregions of Brazil